Robert Martin Willcocks (4 April 1921 – 1 April 1998) was a British philatelist who signed the Roll of Distinguished Philatelists in 1989.

Publications
 England’s Postal History to 1840, 1975, 
 The Postal History of Great Britain and Ireland, 1972, 

With Barry Jay:
 The Postal History of Great Britain and Ireland,  1980
 The British county catalogue of postal history. Vol. 1, 1978, 
 The British county catalogue of postal history. Vol. 2, 1981, 
 The British county catalogue of postal history. Vol. 3, London, 1983, 
 The British county catalogue of postal history. Vol. 4, 1988, 
 The British county catalogue of postal history. Vol. 5, 1990, 

With W.A. Sedgewick:
 The Spoon Experiment 1853-1858, 1960

References

British philatelists
Signatories to the Roll of Distinguished Philatelists
1921 births
1998 deaths